Korus-e Bala (also Romanized as Korūs-e Bālā; also known as Ḩasanābād, Korūs, and Kūros-e Bālā) is a village in Eyvanki Rural District, Eyvanki District, Garmsar County, Semnan Province, Iran. At the 2006 census, its population was 31, in 8 families.

References 

Populated places in Garmsar County